Haircut One Hundred (also Haircut 100) are a British pop group formed in 1980 in Beckenham, London, by Nick Heyward, Les Nemes and Graham Jones. In 1981 and 1982, the band scored four UK top-10  singles: "Favourite Shirts (Boy Meets Girl)", "Love Plus One", "Nobody's Fool", and "Fantastic Day".

History

Formation and Pelican West
Nick Heyward and Les Nemes had been in several bands together since 1977. They gigged under the names Rugby, Boat Party, and Captain Pennyworth, but did not release any music. Their last band together, Moving England, with Sex Gang Children's Rob Stroud, released one single. Heyward and Nemes moved to London in 1980 where they recruited friend and guitarist Graham Jones. During a meeting brainstorming band name ideas, Heyward suggested Haircut 100 and because it was the one "that made us laugh the most" they kept it. The three were joined by drummer Patrick Hunt. Managed by Karl Adams, the band recorded some demos. Phil Smith played saxophone on the sessions and he joined the group, followed by percussionist Marc Fox. The group played some live dates and were signed by Arista Records in 1981. They entered Chalk Farm's Roundhouse studios to record their debut single, "Favourite Shirts (Boy Meets Girl)", which became their first hit, reaching No. 4 in the UK Singles Chart in late 1981, and resulted in their first appearance on BBC Television's Top of the Pops.

For the recording of their debut album, Pelican West, Blair Cunningham replaced Hunt on drums. Their second single, "Love Plus One", was released in January 1982 and gave the band their second UK top 10 hit. Pelican West was released in February, reaching No. 2 in the UK Albums Chart. The band became internationally famous and toured the globe. "Love Plus One" reached the US top 40, and they secured further UK top 10 hits in 1982 with the singles "Fantastic Day" and "Nobody's Fool".

Heyward leaves and Paint and Paint
In late 1982, tensions began arising within the band as they struggled to record new material, which was hindered when Heyward refused to attend recording sessions. Eventually, in January 1983, the band's forthcoming single, "Whistle Down the Wind", was postponed and a statement was issued confirming that the band and Heyward were parting company. At the time, Heyward told Smash Hits magazine that he had been contemplating going solo for some time and had already recorded some tracks with session musicians. However, many years later, Heyward stated that he had been struggling with stress and depression at the time after a year of constant work and pressure, which led to him being, in effect, sacked by the other members of the band. With the loss of the band's frontman and main songwriter, Fox took over vocal duties and the band continued to write material themselves (several B-sides during Heyward's tenure had been credited to the whole band). The band left Arista and signed with Polydor Records, but further singles by this line-up failed to reach the UK top 40 and their follow-up album, Paint and Paint (1984) failed to chart. The band split up soon after. Heyward, however, embarked on a successful solo career in 1983, and scored several chart hits (including the aforementioned song "Whistle Down the Wind", which was his first solo release in March 1983) and a top 10 album, North of a Miracle.

Reunions
In 2004, more than 20 years after their split, Haircut 100 (including Heyward) reunited for the VH1 show Bands Reunited and performed "Love Plus One" and "Fantastic Day". There were no further appearances from the band until five years later in 2009, when they rekindled their friendship via Facebook, and Heyward invited the rest of the band to perform at one of his solo gigs. The band (comprising Heyward, Jones, Nemes and Cunningham) then played London's Indig02 on 28 January 2011, performing Pelican West in its entirety. The performance was recorded and released as a live CD. In 2013, the band's official website stated that they had been working on new material together; however, it has not been released.

Though he did not mention new Haircut One Hundred material, Heyward commented in 2017 interviews that he has a "deep love" for the band, and is "ever hopeful" that the band will eventually reform for a reunion show at the Roundhouse.

In November 2022, Heyward announced on his Facebook page that the Pelican West album was due for a new Super Deluxe 4CD re-issue in early 2023. To celebrate the forthcoming release, Haircut 100 will be featured in a BBC Radio 2 Piano Room session on 16 February 2023 and will perform a one off show at the O2 Shepherd's Bush Empire, London, on 12 May 2023.

Band members
 Nick Heyward (born 20 May 1961, Beckenham, Kent) – lead vocals, guitar (1980–1983, 2004, 2009–2013)
 Les Nemes (born 5 December 1960, Croydon, Surrey) – bass (1980–1984, 2004, 2009–2013)
 Graham Jones (born 8 July 1961, Bridlington, East Yorkshire) – guitar (1980–1984, 2004, 2009–2013)
 Patrick Hunt (born in Shaftesbury, Dorset) – drums (1980)
 Phil Smith (born 1 May 1959, Redbridge, Essex) – saxophone (1980–1984, 2004, 2009–2013)
 Marc Fox (born 13 February 1958, Recklinghausen, West Germany) – percussion, vocals (1980–1984, 2004, 2009–2013)
 Blair Cunningham (born 11 October 1957, Harlem, New York City) – drums (1981–1984, 2004, 2009–2013)

Discography

Studio albums

Singles

Live albums

Compilations

References

External links
Official website

English new wave musical groups
English pop music groups
Musical groups established in 1980
Musical groups disestablished in 1984
Musical groups reestablished in 2004
Musical groups disestablished in 2004
Musical groups reestablished in 2009
Musical groups from London
Second British Invasion artists